In Western handwriting, horizontal progression is the gradual movement from left to right during writing a line of text. In Hebrew and Arabic writing systems, the movement is from right to left.

See also
Graphonomics

Writing